The Pitafis (پتافي) are an ethnic Baloch tribe found in Pakistan, especially in the Dera Ghazi Khan district.

References 

Baloch tribes
Social groups of Pakistan